Delia Wanda Oppo is an American scientist who works on paleoceanography where she focuses on past variations in water circulation and the subsequent impact on Earth's climate system. She was elected a fellow of the American Geophysical Union in 2014.

Education and career
Oppo has a B.S. from the State University of New York at Albany (1981). She earned her Ph.D. from Columbia University in 1989 where she worked on changes in thermohaline circulation. Following her Ph.D she started at Woods Hole Oceanographic Institution as a postdoctoral scientist working with William Curry. As of 2006, she is a senior scientist at Woods Hole Oceanographic Institution.

In 2014, Oppo was elected a fellow of the American Geophysical Union who cited her "for her contributions toward understanding the causes of Earth’s climate variability and its link to ocean circulation and the hydrological cycle".

Research 
Oppo's research tracks past changes in ocean circulation, and the resulting impact of these changes on regional climate. Her research uses stable isotopes of carbon which are captured in the shells of foraminifera. In the Atlantic Ocean, her research has examined changes in deep and intermediate water circulation, and climate variability in the North Atlantic. Her research has revealed a weakening of the Gulf Stream, which may impact weather patterns in the United States and Europe. She has also investigated abrupt climate events in the past  and changes in the heat content of the ocean over the past 10,000 years, research which shows that the ocean is warming faster than in the past.

Selected publications

Awards and honors 
Emiliani lecture, American Geophysical Union (2009)
Fellow, American Geophysical Union (2014)

References

External links

Year of birth missing (living people)
Living people
University at Albany, SUNY alumni
Columbia University alumni
Fellows of the American Geophysical Union
Woods Hole Oceanographic Institution
Women oceanographers
Place of birth missing (living people)
American oceanographers
20th-century American women scientists
21st-century American women scientists